Vestnik or vesnik means messenger or herald in several Slavic languages, and is used as a generic name in various news publications. It may refer to
Vestnik
Armianskiy Vestnik (Armenian Herald), Armenian-Russian magazine published in Moscow from 1916 to 1918
Vilenskij Vestnik (Vilnian Herald), newspaper published in Vilnius from 1840 to 1915.
Bogoslovni vestnik (Theological Quarterly), peer-reviewed journal on theology 
Meditsinskiy Vestnik (Medical Herald), Russian language newspaper published in Belarus
Planinski Vestnik (magazine), Slovenian monthly magazine
Severny Vestnik (Northern Herald), Russian literary magazine 
Vestnik Evropy (Herald of Europe), the major liberal magazine of late-nineteenth-century Russia
Vestnik Manʹchzhurii (Manchuria Monitor), journal of the economy of Manchuria published from 1923
Vestnik Teatra (Theatre Courier), the journal of the Theatre Department of Narkompros, founded in Moscow in 1919

Vesnik
Utrinski vesnik, a daily newspaper in Macedonia
Yevgeny Vesnik (1923–2009), Russian stage and a film actor
Vjesnik, a Croatian daily newspaper